Adalbert Androvits (9 January 1926 – 2005) was a Romanian football right defender.

International career
Adalbert Androvits played seven games at international level for Romania including two qualification matches for the 1954 World Cup.

Honours
Steaua București
Cupa României: 1948–49

Notes

References

External links
 

1926 births
2005 deaths
Romanian footballers
Romania international footballers
Association football defenders
Liga I players
Liga II players
CAM Timișoara players
FC Steaua București players
FC CFR Timișoara players
Sportspeople from Timișoara